Benjaminiella is a genus of fungi belonging to the family Mucoraceae.

The genus name of Benjaminiella is in honour of Richard Keith Benjamin (1922 - 2002), an American botanist from Rancho Santa Ana Botanic Garden.

Species:
 Benjaminiella multispora Benny, Samson & M.C.Sriniv.
 Benjaminiella poitrasii (R.K.Benj.) Arx
 Benjaminiella youngii P.M.Kirk

References

Fungi
Fungus genera